Cat Sense is a 2013 non-fiction book written by John Bradshaw. It was published on August 15, 2013, and was chosen by The New York Times as one of its best-sellers in 2013.
It was also publicly well received and praised for its humorist approach to its subject: cat psychology.
Major newspapers and radios gave good reviews. NPR, for example, included it as an NPR Staff Pick on their "Guide to 2013's Great Reads."

References 

Natural history books
British non-fiction books
American non-fiction books
Books about cats
English non-fiction books